Plymouth Church is an historic church located at 57 Orange Street between Henry and Hicks Streets in the Brooklyn Heights neighborhood of Brooklyn, New York City; the Church House has the address 75 Hicks Street. The church was built in 1849–50 and was designed by Joseph C. Wells. Under the leadership of its first minister, Henry Ward Beecher, it became the foremost center of anti-slavery sentiment in the mid-19th century. It has been listed on the National Register of Historic Places since 1961, and has been a National Historic Landmark since 1966. It is part of the Brooklyn Heights Historic District, created by the New York City Landmarks Preservation Commission in 1965.

The church is a member of the National Association of Congregational Christian Churches.

History
Plymouth Church was founded in 1847 by 21 transplanted New Englanders, who were part of a circle centered around the wealthy evangelical merchants Arthur and Lewis Tappan. Among them were noted businessmen such as Henry C. Bowen, John Tasker Howard, David Hale, and Seth Hunt.  It was the third Congregationalist church to be organized in Brooklyn – then a separate city from New York. The site where the church building would be located was purchased from the First Presbyterian Church, which had been worshipping there since 1822, but which needed more space. It moved to a new site on Henry Street, a few blocks away.

Plymouth Church's first pastor was Henry Ward Beecher, who became a leading figure in the abolitionist movement. His sister was Harriet Beecher Stowe, noted today as the author of the anti-slavery novel Uncle Tom's Cabin (1852) that "helped lay the groundwork for the Civil War." The church itself became an important station on the Underground Railroad through which slaves from the South were secretly transported to Canada. Locally known as "the Grand Central Depot," slaves were hidden in the tunnel-like basement beneath the church sanctuary. The Rev. Charles B. Ray, an African-American living in Manhattan, and the founding editor of The Colored American newspaper, was quoted as saying, "I regularly drop off fugitives at Henry Ward Beecher's Plymouth Church in Brooklyn." Plymouth Church is one of the few active Underground Railroad congregations in New York still housed in its original location.

One of the main recurring events that garnered considerable public attention were Beecher's mock slave auctions. Imitating events like this in the South, Beecher would bring slaves into the sanctuary, auction them off to the highest bidder, and then set them free. The most famous case involved "Pinky", a 9-year-old slave girl who had escaped from Alabama. On February 5, 1860, in front of a crowd of 3000, Mr. Beecher started the  bidding and a collection plate was passed around the congregation. When the plate with $900 and a golden ring reached the pulpit, Beecher picked up the ring and placed it on the finger of Pinky. He exclaimed, "Remember, with this ring I do wed thee to freedom." Sixty-seven years later, Pinky returned to Plymouth, now a well-educated woman, named Mrs. Rose Ward Hunt, and returned the ring Beecher had given to her.

In October 1859, the church offered Abraham Lincoln $200 for coming to Brooklyn and giving a lecture to the congregation. Lincoln accepted the invitation, traveled to Brooklyn and participate in church service on Sunday, February 26. Today a plaque marks the pew where Lincoln attended the service. Because of high demand, Lincoln's address was moved to Cooper Union, where a 25 cents admission fee was charged. Lincoln gave his famous anti-slavery speech before a capacity crowd of 1,500 on February 27, 1860, more than eight months before he was elected President.

In 1867, a group from Plymouth Church undertook a five-and-a-half month voyage aboard the steamer Quaker City to Europe and the Holy Land. Joining them as a journalist was the young Mark Twain. His satiric account of this pioneering tour group, The Innocents Abroad, was Twain's best-selling work throughout his lifetime.

In 1875, a history of rumored extramarital affairs by Beecher and his condemnation from the pulpit of Victoria Woodhull's advocacy of free love among other factors culminated in the "Beecher-Tilton Scandal Case". The highly publicized two-and-a-half-year-long case resulted in the disfellowshiping of aggrieved husband and church member Theodore Tilton, legal and church exoneration of the pastor, and condemnation of him by Elizabeth Cady Stanton and others including his younger half-sister Isabella Beecher Hooker.

Beecher died suddenly in 1887. He was succeeded by Lyman Abbott (1887-1899), a lawyer turned minister and religious journalist; Newell Dwight Hillis (1899-1924), who oversaw the completion of the Plymouth campus as it exists today; J. Stanley Durkee (1926-1940), a former President of Howard University; L. Wendell Fifield (1941-1955), a pastor of Seattle's Plymouth Congregational Church widely known for his active role in civic affairs throughout the Pacific Northwest; and Rev. Harry H. Kruener (1960-1984), Dean of the chapel at Denison University. In 1991, Rev. Sharon Blackburn, who had served as associate pastor of the First Presbyterian Church, located a few blocks from Plymouth Church, became the first female minister in the church's history, following the short tenures of Rev. Frank Goodwin (1985–88) and Rev. Richard Stanger (1988-1991).

In addition to Lincoln and Twain many other famous writers and activists spoke at Plymouth, including William Lloyd Garrison, Wendell Phillips, Charles Sumner, John Greenleaf Whittier, Clara Barton, Charles Dickens, Ralph Waldo Emerson, Horace Greeley, and William Thackery. More recently, in February 1963, Martin Luther King Jr. preached a sermon on "The American Dream," echoed just months later in his famous "I Have a Dream" speech at the Lincoln Memorial in Washington, DC. Senator Hillary Clinton spoke at Plymouth in 2001, and two noted minimalist composers, Philip Glass and Charlemagne Palestine, gave concerts using Plymouth's Aeolian-Skinner organ.

Plymouth Church merged with the Congregational Church of the Pilgrims in 1934, and the resulting combined congregation was named Plymouth Church of the Pilgrims. The Congregational Church of the Pilgrims left its Richard Upjohn-designed church building, which later was designated a New York City Landmark as  Our Lady of Lebanon Maronite Catholic Church. The building's stained-glass windows, including windows by Louis Comfort Tiffany and Tiffany Studios, were moved to Plymouth Church's nearby Hillis Hall. The church also displays a  piece of Plymouth Rock, from the traditional landing site of the Mayflower Pilgrims.

In 1958, the congregation voted against becoming part of the newly formed United Church of Christ, which came about through a merger of the Congregational Christian Churches and the Evangelical and Reformed Church; it is now a member of the National Association of Congregational Christian Churches. The church reverted to its original name, "Plymouth Church", in September, 2011.

Today the congregation consists of about 425 members who form a covenant community.  That means each member is bound to God and to every other member of the community by a solemn vow. Plymouth adapted the Salem (Massachusetts) Covenant of 1629. The church has used the Kansas City Statement of Faith as its own since its adoption by the Congregational Christian Churches in 1913. As a congregational church, each member is empowered to participate in the decision-making of the congregation. The church is actively supporting various anti-human-trafficking groups, the Mission School of Hope in Eastern Cameroon, Habitat for Humanity,  the Hope Program, and Brooklyn anti-hunger initiatives.

On April 17, 2016, it was announced that the Rev. Dr. Brett Younger will be the 11th settled senior minister in Plymouth's 169-year history. He succeeds the Rev. Dr. David C. Fisher who retired in September 2013, after leading the Plymouth congregation for 9 years. Rev. Al Bunis, a longtime member of Plymouth who had become Rev. Dr. Fisher's assistant pastor, and Rev. Tom Lenhart had served as interim senior ministers during the transition.

Architecture

Built in 1849–50, Plymouth Church is an  example of 19th century urban tabernacle architecture with italianate and colonial motifs. Its layout, influenced by the Broadway Tabernacle in Manhattan, was designed by Joseph C. Wells – who was later one of the founders of the American Institute of Architects. The barn-like church building, with its pews arranged in an arc before the pulpit, resemble more an auditorium or theater than what had traditionally been considered a church. This open design was adopted by many evangelical Protestant churches throughout the United States in the second half of the 19th century.

In 1866, the church's original pipe organ was replaced by E. and G. G. Hook, which installed what was then the largest organ in the United States, expanded further by Aeolian-Skinner in 1937.

In 1907–09, the church installed stained-glass windows by the noted J&R Lamb Studios. This studio opened it doors in 1857 and is now the oldest existing studio of its kind in the US. The windows in Plymouth Church are unique in that they do not depict any biblical scenes. Instead they focus on the history of democracy in England and the US, with a particular emphasis on the influence of the Puritans, Pilgrims and Congregational Churches. In 1913 the family of John Arbuckle, a coffee merchant, donated money to create a large garden and the Classic revival parish house.  The house and arcade which adjoin the building were designed by Woodruff Leeming.

The church garden, fronting on Orange Street and located between the Church House and the Sanctuary, contains a statue of Beecher and a bas-relief of Lincoln. Both were produced by famed sculptor Gutzon Borglum, who later created the Mount Rushmore National Memorial. An almost identical statue of Beecher is located less than a mile away, next to Cadman Plaza, in front of Brooklyn's historic Federal Building and Post Office.

It is located within the Brooklyn Heights Historic District, designated on November 23, 1965, by the New York City Landmarks Preservation Commission.

Tours of the church, including its grounds, the Sanctuary, Hillis Hall, and the original Underground Railroad facilities, are available upon request. From 2000 to 2015, these tours were given by Lois Rosebrooks, the long-time director of history ministry services.

See also
List of Underground Railroad sites

References
Notes

Bibliography
 Applegate, Debby (2006) The Most Famous Man in America: The Biography of Henry Ward Beecher New York: Doubleday.

External links

Official website
Plymouth Church of the Pilgrims site on "Aboard the Underground Railroad", National Park Service tour list
Henry Ward Beecher (1813-1887), at the Lincoln Institute's Mr. Lincoln and New York
A model of Plymouth Church

Churches in Brooklyn
National Historic Landmarks in New York City
Properties of religious function on the National Register of Historic Places in Brooklyn
Churches on the Underground Railroad
Churches completed in 1849
19th-century churches in the United States
Congregational churches in New York City
Brooklyn Heights
1849 establishments in New York (state)
Historic district contributing properties in New York City
Underground Railroad in New York (state)
African-American history in New York City